Clifford Joseph Emmich (December 13, 1936 – November 28, 2022) was an American film, stage and television actor. He appeared in over 90 films and television programs, and is perhaps best known for playing the character of Chicago in the 1973 film Payday.

Life and career 
Clifford Joseph Emmich was born on December 13, 1936, in Cincinnati, Ohio. He began his career on stage, as he was a student at the Pasadena Playhouse. While mainly appearing on stage, Emmich performed in summer stock theaters, such as the Pink Garter Theatre, as he had played Molly's Father on the play I Ain't Down Yet in Jackson, Wyoming. He had toured on 153 cities at 23 states with the American Repertory Players.

Emmich began his film and television career in 1969, when he played an uncredited role in the film Gaily, Gaily. As he later appeared in numerous television programs including The Odd Couple, Ironside, Trapper John, M.D., 227, Murder, She Wrote, Happy Days, Mary Hartman, Mary Hartman, Fantasy Island, Who's the Boss?, Charlie's Angels, Columbo, Walker, Texas Ranger, Knots Landing, Police Woman and Baywatch. He also appeared in films such as, Payday (1973), Invasion of the Bee Girls (1973), Thunderbolt and Lightfoot (1974), Rafferty and the Gold Dust Twins (1975), Aloha Bobby and Rose (1975), Bad Georgia Road (1977), Stingray (1978), Barracuda (1978), Halloween II (1981), Hellhole (1985), Return to Horror High (1987), Mouse Hunt (1997) and Inspector Gadget (1999).

In 1978, when Emmich guest-starred on Little House on the Prairie, he stated that "there was nothing even funny about being fat". He spent most of his life on a healthy diet, which he later abandoned.

Emmich died of lung cancer on November 28, 2022, shortly before his 86th birthday, at his home in the Valley Village neighborhood of Los Angeles.

References

External links 

Rotten Tomatoes profile

1936 births
2022 deaths
Male actors from Cincinnati
American male film actors
American male television actors
American male stage actors
20th-century American male actors
Deaths from lung cancer in California